The Battle of Pine's Bridge was a minor engagement during the American Revolutionary War in the town of Yorktown, New York, on May 14, 1781. Loyalist forces under the command of James De Lancey surprised an American defensive position guarding the Pine's Bridge crossing of the Croton River held by the Rhode Island Regiment (which had some African-American soldiers) along with detached soldiers of the Massachusetts Continental Line and the New Hampshire Continental Line on the north bank of the Croton River, killing and capturing many of the American soldiers.  

Colonel Christopher Greene and Major Ebenezer Flagg of the Rhode Island Regiment were killed in the action. Greene and Flagg were buried at the 1st Presbyterian Church in nearby Yorktown where their graves are marked by a large monument.  Near the monument, a second stone marker and plaque known as the Monument to the First Rhode Island Regiment honors the memory of some African-American soldiers who died defending their commander.

References

1781 in the United States
Conflicts in 1781
Pine's Bridge
Pine's Bridge
Pine's Bridge
Pine's Bridge
Westchester County, New York
1781 in New York (state)